The enzyme 1,5-anhydro-D-fructose dehydratase catalyzes the chemical reaction

1,5-anhydro-D-fructose  1,5-anhydro-4-deoxy-D-glycero-hex-3-en-2-ulose + HO

It catalyzes two steps in the anhydrofructose pathway process.

This enzyme belongs to the family of lyases, specifically the hydro-lyases, which cleave carbon-oxygen bonds. The systematic name of this enzyme class is 1,5-anhydro-D-fructose hydro-lyase (ascopyrone-M-forming). Other names in common use include 1,5-anhydro-D-fructose 4-dehydratase, 1,5-anhydro-D-fructose hydrolyase, 1,5-anhydro-D-arabino-hex-2-ulose dehydratase, AFDH, AF dehydratase, and 1,5-anhydro-D-fructose hydro-lyase.

References

See also 

 Anhydrofructose pathway
 Ascopyrone tautomerase
 exo-(1→4)-α-D-glucan lyase

EC 4.2.1
Enzymes of unknown structure